Stephanie Brooks (born 1970) is an American artist known for her conceptual and text-based artworks.

She obtained a Bachelor's in Fine Arts in 1994 from Ohio University in Athens, Ohio, and a Master's in Fine Arts in 1997 from the University of Illinois Chicago.

Her work is included in the permanent collections of the Whitney Museum of American Art and the Museum of Contemporary Art, Chicago.

References

External links
Official website

21st-century American women artists
1970 births
Living people